C Gopalkrishnan (ta:சி.கோபாலகிருஷ்ணன்) (born 1962) is an Indian politician and Member of Parliament elected from Tamil Nadu. He is elected to the Lok Sabha from Nilgiris constituency as an Anna Dravida Munnetra Kazhagam candidate in 2014 election.

He is the Chairman of the Coonoor Municipality.

References 

All India Anna Dravida Munnetra Kazhagam politicians
Living people
India MPs 2014–2019
Lok Sabha members from Tamil Nadu
1962 births
People from Coonoor
People from Nilgiris district